South Grade School Building, also known as the Administration Building, Twin Lakes School Corporation, is a historic two-room school building located at Monticello, White County, Indiana. It was built in 1892, and is a -story, brick building with a gable on hip roof.  It is seven bays wide and has a three bay wide central pedimented pavilion.

It was listed on the National Register of Historic Places in 1985.

References

School buildings on the National Register of Historic Places in Indiana
School buildings completed in 1892
Buildings and structures in White County, Indiana
National Register of Historic Places in White County, Indiana